Cuthbert is an unincorporated community in Sanborn County, in the U.S. state of South Dakota.

History
A post office called Cuthbert was established in 1908, and remained in operation until 1954. An early variant name was Espe.

References

Unincorporated communities in Sanborn County, South Dakota
Unincorporated communities in South Dakota